Emil Kijewski (November 22, 1911 - January 23, 1989) was a German professional road bicycle racer. He is most known for his silver medal in the Elite race of the 1937 Road World Championships.

Palmares 

1934 - Presto
1935
 1st, Rund um Köln
 1st, Sachsen GP
 10th, World Road Race Championship
1936
 3rd, National Road Race Championship
1937 - Wanderer
 1st, Rund um Köln
 1st, Rund um Berlin
 1st, Stage 8, Tour de Suisse
 1st, Stage 10, Deutschland Tour
  World Road Race Championship
 2nd, National Road Race Championship
1938 - Wanderer
 1st, Stage 12, Deutschland Tour
1939 - Wanderer
1940 - Wanderer
1941 - Wanderer
1942 - Wanderer
1948 - Dürkopp
1949 - Dürkopp
1950 - Dürkopp
 1st, Stage 1, Schwarzland Rundfahrt

References

1911 births
1989 deaths
German male cyclists
Cyclists from Dortmund
People from the Province of Westphalia
Tour de Suisse stage winners
20th-century German people